14 Shots to the Dome is the fifth studio album by American hip hop recording artist LL Cool J. It was released on March 30, 1993 via Def Jam Recordings. Recording sessions took place at Marley's House Of Hits, at Cove City Sound Studios and at Unique Recording Studios in New York, and at QDIII Soundlab in Los Angeles, at Bobcat's House in Palmdale, and at Encore Studio in Burbank. Production was handled by Marley Marl, DJ Bobcat, Quincy Jones III, Andrew Zenable and Chris Forte. It features guest appearances from Lords of the Underground and Lieutenant Stitchie.

The album peaked at number five on the Billboard 200 and topped the Top R&B/Hip-Hop Albums chart. On June 2, 1993, it was certified Gold by the Recording Industry Association of America.

It spawned three charted singles: "How I'm Comin'", "Pink Cookies In a Plastic Bag Getting Crushed by Buildings" b/w "Back Seat (of My Jeep)" and "Stand By Your Man".

It is his first album following his hugely successful previous album 1990's Mama Said Knock You Out. Unlike that release, which saw him have success on his own terms, 14 Shots sees LL adopting the sound of his West Coast gangsta rap contemporaries, especially that of Ice Cube and Cypress Hill. Many fans saw this as a jarring departure, and the album met mixed critical and commercial response. The album's second single "Back Seat" would later be sampled by R&B artist Monica for her debut single "Don't Take It Personal" which became a major hit two years later.

Track listing

Sample credits
Track 1 contains elements from "Hot Pants (I'm Coming, I'm Coming)" written by James Brown and performed by Bobby Byrd
Track 3 contains samples from "Fool's Paradise" written by Lesette Wilson and Joyce Melissa Morgan and performed by Meli'sa Morgan and "La Di Da Di" written and performed by Slick Rick and Doug E. Fresh
Track 4 contains elements from "Groove Me" written and performed by King Floyd
Track 5 contains a sample from "Blind Alley" written and performed by David Porter
Track 6 contains elements from "The Payback" written by James Brown, Fred Wesley and John Starks and performed by James Brown
Track 7 embodies portions of the composition "Wonderland by Night" written by Klaus Günter Neumann and Lincoln Chase
Track 8 contains samples from "Hollywood Squares" written by William Collins, Frank Waddy and George Clinton and performed by Bootsy's Rubber Band, and "One Nation Under a Groove" written by George Clinton, Garry Shider and Walter "Junie" Morrison and performed by Funkadelic
Track 9 contains samples from "Get Up & Dance" courtesy of Malaco Records and "Horn Hits for DJs" under license from Tuff City Records
Track 11 contains elements from "Mother's Son" written and performed by Curtis Mayfield
Track 12 contains a sample from "Get Up Get Down" written by Tony Hester and performed by The Dramatics

Personnel
 James Todd Smith – main artist
 Dawn Green – backing vocals (tracks: 1, 3)
 Cindy Mizelle – backing vocals (track 14)
 Marsha McClurkin – backing vocals (track 14)
 Mary Brown – backing vocals (track 14)
 Nicki Richards – backing vocals (track 14)
 Paulette McWilliams – backing vocals (track 14)
 Stan "The Guitar Man" Jones – bass & guitar (tracks: 8, 12, 13)
 Marlon "Marley Marl" Williams – producer (tracks: 1, 3-7, 9)
 Bobby "Bobcat" Ervin – producer (tracks: 8, 12-14), arranger (tracks: 8, 13), mixing (track 8)
 Quincy Delight Jones III – producer (tracks: 2, 10, 11), recording (tracks: 2, 10)
 Andrew Zenable – producer (track 11)
 Christopher Joseph Forte – producer (track 11)
 George Karras – engineering (tracks: 1-7, 9-11), mixing (tracks: 8, 12, 13), arranger (track 14)
 Frank Heller – engineering (tracks: 1, 3-7, 9)
 Dan Hetzel – recording (tracks: 8, 14)
 Steve Fredrickson – recording (tracks: 12, 13)
 Howie Weinberg – mastering
 Jeff Trotter – A&R executive
 Glen E. Friedman – photography
 Albert Watson – photography

Charts

Certifications

See also
List of Billboard number-one R&B albums of 1993

References

External links

1993 albums
LL Cool J albums
Hardcore hip hop albums
Def Jam Recordings albums
Albums produced by Marley Marl
Albums produced by Quincy Jones III